BFV may refer to:

 Baden Football Association, the Badischer Fussball-Verband, a regional football association in Germany
 Bavarian Football Association, the Bayerischer Fussball-Verband, a regional football association in Germany
 Berlin Football Association, the Berliner Fussball-Verband, a regional football association in Germany
 Bremen Football Association, the Bremer Fußball-Verband, a regional football association in Germany
 BFV Hassia Bingen, a German football club
 Bradley Fighting Vehicle, a United States family of armored fighting vehicles
 Benjamin Franklin Village, a United States Army installation in Germany
 Federal Office for the Protection of the Constitution, or Bundesamt für Verfassungsschutz, the German domestic intelligence agency
 Buriram Airport, an airport in Thailand (IATA airport code: BFV)
 Battlefield Vietnam, a 2004 video game
 Battlefield V, a 2018 video game by EA DICE